Collagen alpha-2(IX) chain is a protein that in humans is encoded by the COL9A2 gene.

This gene encodes one of the three alpha chains of type IX collagen, the major collagen component of hyaline cartilage. Type IX collagen, a heterotrimeric molecule, is usually found in tissues containing type II collagen, a fibrillar collagen. This chain is unusual in that, unlike the other two type IX alpha chains, it contains a covalently attached glycosaminoglycan side chain. Mutations in this gene are associated with multiple epiphyseal dysplasia.

References

External links
  GeneReviews/NCBI/NIH/UW entry on Multiple Epiphyseal Dysplasia, Dominant

Further reading

Collagens